Rogelio Famatid (born 9 December 1943) is a Filipino wrestler. He competed at the 1968 Summer Olympics and the 1972 Summer Olympics.

References

External links
 

1943 births
Living people
Filipino male sport wrestlers
Olympic wrestlers of the Philippines
Wrestlers at the 1968 Summer Olympics
Wrestlers at the 1972 Summer Olympics
Sportspeople from Iloilo City